Yuri Lima Lara (born 20 April 1994) is a Brazilian footballer who plays as a defensive midfielder for Yokohama FC.

Playing career
He played for Olaria, Bahia and CSA. He joined J2 League club Tochigi SC in 2019.

References

External links

1994 births
Living people
Footballers from Rio de Janeiro (city)
Brazilian footballers
Brazilian expatriate footballers
Association football midfielders
Campeonato Brasileiro Série A players
Campeonato Brasileiro Série B players
J2 League players
Olaria Atlético Clube players
Esporte Clube Bahia players
Centro Sportivo Alagoano players
Oeste Futebol Clube players
CR Vasco da Gama players
Tochigi SC players
Brazilian expatriate sportspeople in Japan
Expatriate footballers in Japan